The 1989 Swedish Golf Tour was the sixth season of the Swedish Golf Tour, a series of professional golf tournaments held in Sweden and Finland.

Schedule
The season consisted of 14 events played between May and September.

Order of Merit

References

Swedish Golf Tour
Swedish Golf Tour